Christmas Blues is an EP, the first recording by the Holly Cole Trio. It was released in 1989 on Alert Records in Canada.  It is notable for the Jazz cover of The Pretenders' "2,000 Miles"

Track listing

 "The Christmas Blues" (Sammy Cahn, David Jack Holt) – 2:54
 "Two Thousand Miles" (Chrissie Hynde) – 3:32
 "Please Come Home for Christmas" (Brown, Redd) – 3:04
 "I'd Like to Hitch a Ride With Santa Claus" (Burke, VanHeusen) – 2:18

Personnel

 Holly Cole – Vocals
 Aaron Davis – Piano
 David Piltch – Bass

Year-end charts

References

External links
Allmusic [ link]

Holly Cole albums
1989 EPs
1989 Christmas albums
Christmas albums by Canadian artists
Jazz Christmas albums